Marcos Magalhães (born in 1958 in Rio de Janeiro, Brazil) is the author of short films such as "Meow!" (Special Jury Prize at the 1982 Cannes Film Festival) and "Animando", shot in the National Film Board of Canada.

He has been responsible for the first professional course in animation in Brazil, held in collaboration with the National Film Board of Canada from 1985 to 1987.
In 1986, he coordinated "Planet Earth", a collective film by 30 Brazilian animators for UN's Year of Peace.

He's the conceiver and producer of "Eight Point Star", a film entirely animated by late Fernando Diniz, a renowned naïf painter who lived in a psychiatric institution in Brazil.
As an artist-in-residence at the Division of Animation and Digital Arts of the University of Southern California, he completed in 1999 the film TwO, a 3D computer animation combined with animated scratches on 35 mm film.

In 2000, he produced for Nickelodeon the first Latin-American episode for the series “Short Films by Short People”.
In 2002, he becomes a John Simon Guggenheim Foundation fellow with the project "Dar Alma", that conceives animation workshops for non-professionals.
He's an animation teacher in the Design graduation course since 2002 and also coordinator of the Animation post-graduation course since 2004 at the Pontifical Catholic University of Rio de Janeiro (PUC-Rio).

He is also one of the founders and directors of Anima Mundi, International Animation Festival of Brazil, the biggest annual event on animation in Latin America since 1993.

References

External links
 

Brazilian animated film directors
1958 births
Living people
People from Rio de Janeiro (city)
Pontifical Catholic University of Rio de Janeiro people